Sir Charles Hardy Group is a national park in Far North Queensland, Australia, 1,997 km northwest of Brisbane.

See also

 Protected areas of Queensland

National parks of Far North Queensland
Protected areas established in 1989
1989 establishments in Australia